Rhytiphora sospitalis is a species of beetle in the family Cerambycidae. It was described by Francis Polkinghorne Pascoe in 1865. It is known from Australia.

References

sospitalis
Beetles described in 1865